Gallant Lady is a 1942 American drama film directed by William Beaudine. It stars Rose Hobart, Sidney Blackmer, Claire Rochelle, and Lynn Starr.

Cast
Rose Hobart as Rosemary Walsh
Sidney Blackmer as Steve Carey
Claire Rochelle as Nellie
Lynn Starr as Linda
Jane Novak as Lucy Walker
Vince Barnett as Baldy
Jack Baxley as Sheriff Verner
Crane Whitley as Pete Saunders
John Ince as Judge Stevens
Frank Brownlee as Luke Walker
Richard Clarke as Nick Morelli
Spec O'Donnell 	as Ben Walker
Inez Cole as Jane
Pat McKee as Jed Hicks
Ruby Dandridge as Sarah

References

External links
 

1942 films
1942 crime drama films
1940s prison films
American black-and-white films
Films directed by William Beaudine
Warner Bros. films
American crime drama films
American prison drama films
1940s English-language films
1940s American films